Saw palmetto extract is an extract of the fruit of the  saw palmetto. It is marketed as a treatment for benign prostatic hyperplasia, but there is no clinical evidence that it is effective for this purpose.

Uses and research 
Saw palmetto extract is commonly sold as a dietary supplement intended to improve symptoms of benign prostatic hyperplasia (BPH)—also called prostate gland enlargement—which is a common condition among men as they age. An enlarged prostate may cause increased frequency or urgency of urination, difficulty initiating urination, weak urine stream or a stream that stops and starts, dribbling at the end of urination, and inability to completely empty the bladder.
Saw palmetto extract has been studied in clinical trials as a possible treatment for people with prostate cancer and for men with lower urinary tract symptoms associated with BPH. , there is insufficient scientific evidence that saw palmetto extract is effective for treating cancer or BPH and its symptoms.

One 2016 review of clinical studies with a standardized extract of saw palmetto (called Permixon) found that the extract was safe and may be effective for relieving BPH-induced urinary symptoms compared with a placebo.

Folk medicine
Saw palmetto was used in folk medicine to treat coughs or other disorders.

Precautions and contraindications

Children
The use of saw palmetto extract is not recommended in children under 12 years old because it may affect the metabolism of androgen and estrogen hormones.

Pregnancy and lactation
Saw palmetto extract should not be used during pregnancy. The effects of saw palmetto extract on androgen and estrogen metabolism can potentially impair fetal genital development. Saw palmetto extract should also be avoided during breastfeeding due to a lack of available information.

Surgery and bleeding risk
In a case report, a patient taking saw palmetto extract had increased bleeding time during surgery. Bleeding time returned to normal after stopping taking the herb. One clinical trial pre-treated prostate surgery patients with saw palmetto for five weeks prior to the surgery, because there was evidence from earlier literature that such pre-treatment reduced operative bleeding. The trial reported no improvement compared to placebo. As a general rule surgeons should ask patients to discontinue dietary supplements prior to scheduled surgery.

PSA test interference 
Saw palmetto has been shown to reduce the levels of PSA in the blood, a hormone produced by the prostate and used as a marker by healthcare providers to evaluate the presence of prostate cancer. Taking saw palmetto can artificially reduce the levels of PSA, interfering with test results.

Interactions
Saw palmetto extract has extensive interactions with other medications. It may decrease the effectiveness of estrogen products by reducing estrogen levels in the body via its anti-estrogenic effects. It can interfere with the use of birth control pills that contain estrogen as an active ingredient. As a result, it is recommended that an additional form of birth control, such as a condom, be used to prevent pregnancy in patients taking birth control pills with saw palmetto extract. In addition, saw palmetto extract can also interfere with hormone replacement therapy by reducing the effectiveness of estrogen pills. The combination of saw palmetto extract with estrogen products should be used with caution.

When used in combination with an anticoagulant or anti-platelet drug, saw palmetto extract can increase the risk of bleeding by enhancing the anticoagulation or anti-platelet effects. Some examples of anticoagulant and anti-platelet drugs include aspirin, clopidogrel, nonsteroidal anti-inflammatory drugs (NSAIDs), and warfarin.

References

5α-Reductase inhibitors
Dietary supplements
Hair loss medications
Herbalism